Ivan Droppa (born February 1, 1972) is a Slovak retired professional ice hockey defenceman who played 19 games in the National Hockey League for the Chicago Blackhawks between 1993 and 1996. He also played for Slovakia at the 1998 Winter Olympics.

Career statistics

Regular season and playoffs

International

References

External links
 

1972 births
Living people
Carolina Monarchs players
Chicago Blackhawks draft picks
Chicago Blackhawks players
DEG Metro Stars players
Düsseldorfer EG players
HC Košice players
HC Litvínov players
HC Slavia Praha players
Ice hockey players at the 1998 Winter Olympics
Indianapolis Ice players
Kassel Huskies players
MHk 32 Liptovský Mikuláš players
MsHK Žilina players
Nürnberg Ice Tigers players
Olympic ice hockey players of Slovakia
Ours de Villard-de-Lans players
Sportspeople from Liptovský Mikuláš
Schwenninger Wild Wings players
Slovak ice hockey defencemen
Czechoslovak ice hockey defencemen
Expatriate ice hockey players in France
Slovak expatriate ice hockey players in the United States
Slovak expatriate ice hockey players in Germany
Slovak expatriate ice hockey players in the Czech Republic
Slovak expatriate sportspeople in France